Gnaeus Pompeius (Rufus) (died AD 14) was suffect consul in 31 BC, during the transitional period when Octavian, the future Augustus, was consolidating his powers as princeps.

A member of the plebeian gens Pompeia, he may have been one of the Pompeii Rufi, the son of Quintus Pompeius Rufus, and therefore the great-grandson of the dictator Sulla.

A senator, Gnaeus Pompeius was appointed suffect consul to replace Marcus Titius, and he held the office from October 1 through to December 31, 31 BC. Gnaeus Pompeius was also one of the Quindecimviri sacris faciundis, a priestly college, to which he belonged until his death in AD 14.

Sources
 Broughton, T. Robert S., The Magistrates of the Roman Republic, Vol II (1951)
 Broughton, T. Robert S., The Magistrates of the Roman Republic, Vol III (1986)
 Syme, Ronald, The Roman Revolution (1939)

References

14 deaths
1st-century BC Roman consuls
1st-century Romans
Gnaeus
Quindecimviri sacris faciundis
Year of birth unknown